Dorcadion mus is a species of Longhorn beetle in the family Cerambycidae. It was described by Rosenhauer in 1856. It is known from Spain.

See also 
 Dorcadion

References

mus
Beetles described in 1856